Christine Evans (born May 25, 1990) is a Canadian singer-songwriter from Victoria, British Columbia. Her debut single, "Take Me Home"/"Time for Me" was released in 2004 and her debut album, Take Me Home followed on January 25, 2005 by Warner Music Canada.

Education
After graduating from Blair Academy in New Jersey, Evans attended Stanford University and performed with the a cappella group Stanford Talisman. She graduated from Stanford University in June 2012, having majored in English/Creative Writing.

Career
The title track of Take Me Home won the Island Music Award (Vancouver Island) for song of the year. It was included on the Women & Songs 8 collection, which included several famous female singers. An edited version of the "Take Me Home" video was used in a national commercial for Kids Help Phone, for which she is an "artist ambassador".

The video for her second single "I'm So Alone" has been popular on Much Music and Much More Music.

After releasing Take Me Home, she toured with fellow Canadian singers Keshia Chanté, Amanda Stott, and Cassie Steele across Canada in the summer of 2005.

Evans' second album, Push, was released across Canada on June 20, 2006. It included such hits as "Push" and "A Nation Redeemed".

In 2007 she was nominated for several GMA Canada Covenant Awards, including Female Vocalist of the Year, Pop/Contemporary Song of the Year, and Pop/Contemporary Album of the Year.

To promote the radio version of "Give It Up", Evans ran a music video competition from July through September 2007 on the website Dailymotion.com, giving an iPhone to the best entry. The winning submission was produced and directed by Aaron Matthew Kaiser and starred Priscila Netto as Evans in both dramatic and lip-syncing scenes.

Her third EP, entitled Standing on the Edge, was released in 2008.

Evans is also an actress; she played the lead, Amber, in the 2009 film Black and Blue.

References

External links 
 Official site
 Ottawa SuperEx – mini-profile of Evans, along with Chanté, Stott, and Steele, with whom she toured

1990 births
Blair Academy alumni
Living people
Musicians from Victoria, British Columbia
Evans, Christine
21st-century Canadian women singers